The Kostanecki acylation is a method used in organic synthesis to form chromones or coumarins by acylation of O-hydroxyaryl ketones with aliphatic acid anhydrides, followed by cyclization. If benzoic anhydride (or benzoyl chloride) is used, a particular type of chromone called a flavone is obtained.

Mechanism
The mechanism consists of three well-differentiated reactions:
 Phenol O-acylation with formation of a tetrahedral intermediate
 Intramolecular aldol condensation to cyclize and to form a hydroxydihydrochromone
 Elimination of the hydroxyl group to form the chromone (or coumarin)

Examples
Alvocidib (flavopiridol)
Dimefline
Flavoxate

See also
 Allan–Robinson reaction
 Baker–Venkataraman rearrangement

References

Name reactions
Organic reactions
Coumarins